La Paz–Wikenburg Road was a  wagon road from 1863 and from 1866 a stagecoach route between the Colorado River landings at La Paz, Olive City and Mineral City to the mining town of Wickenburg, Arizona. From Wickenburg roads led to other new mining camps and districts in the interior of Arizona Territory. In 1866, the road head changed to the new river landing of Ehrenburg, where the Bradshaw Trail wagon and stagecoach road from San Bernardino, California, crossed the Colorado River at Bradshaw's Ferry.

References

 
1863 establishments in the United States
Geography of La Paz County, Arizona
Geography of Yavapai County, Arizona
Geography of Maricopa County, Arizona
Historic trails and roads in Arizona